is a Japanese professional futsal club, currently playing in the F. League Division 1. The team is located in Urayasu, in the Chiba Prefecture, Japan. Their home ground is Urayasu General Gymnasium.

Chronicle

Current squads

Bardral Urayasu PRIMERO 
.

Type 2

Type 2
Type 2

Bardral Urayasu SEGUNDO 
.

Bardral Urayasu TERCERO 
.

Trophies 
All Japan Futsal Championship  : 2
Winners: 2006, 2008

References

External links 

Futsal clubs in Japan
Sports teams in Chiba Prefecture
Futsal clubs established in 1998
1998 establishments in Japan